Friedberg (Hess) station is the station of Friedberg, Germany, on the Main-Weser Railway.

History

First station

The first Friedberg station was opened on 10 May 1850 with the opening of the section of the Main-Weser Railway from Frankfurt am Main to Friedberg. On 9 November 1850 the next section to Butzbach was opened. The entire route of the Main-Weser line from Kassel to Frankfurt was opened for traffic 15 May 1852. The station was at the 165.4 kilometre mark (from Kassel) and was designed as a through station. There is currently a parking garage on the site of the old station building.

Additional lines were connected to the Main-Weser Railway in Friedberg. On 15 September 1881, the Friedberg–Hanau railway was fully opened, following the commencement of services to Heldenbergen-Windecken (now Nidderau) station on 1 December 1879. On 1 October 1897 the Friedberg–Mücke Railway opened. On 13 July 1901 the Friedberg–Friedrichsdorf–Bad Homburg line opened; this was part of a line from Bad Nauheim to Wiesbaden, also known as the Bäderbahn (Spa Railway). Friedberg became a hub for passengers and freight.

Second station
On 10 August 1913 the second Friedberger station was opened at the 165.9 kilometre mark, about 500 metres further south. On 28 May 1978 the station became the terminal of line S6 of the Rhine-Main S-Bahn.

Railway
Friedberg station has two platforms next to the main station building and four island platforms, that is ten platform faces. One of the main platforms is a bay platform used only for local trains to and from Friedrichsdorf. The trains to Hanau depart from the easternmost platform. East of the platforms is a freight yard with another 12 tracks. Previously, the station handled a large amount of seasonal sugar beet traffic from the surrounding region, the Wetterau. The freight yard is hardly used now. The northern exit from the station led directly on to the Rosental Viaduct (built from 1847 to 1850), which has been replaced since 1982 by a modern concrete bridge, located a few metres to the east.

Buildings
The original buildings were built in a neoclassical style; the entrance building could have been designed by Julius Eugen Ruhl. It was demolished in 1983.

The current station building and other buildings of the station are mostly classed as cultural monuments under the Hessian Heritage Act. The current station building was built in 1912-1913 in a mixture of neoclassical and Renaissance Revival architecture to the design of a government architect from Darmstadt, Krause, who was influenced by Armin Wegner. In the vestibule are original ceramic tiles and stained glass windows, which are influenced by Art Nouveau.

North of the station building is a former royal reception building, which was constructed in 1897-98, south of the original station and later moved to the new station.

Train services

Long distance

Every two hours, an ICE service from Hamburg to Karlsruhe stops in Friedberg station. Two train pairs go to/from Schwerin. One train pair on this line runs as an Intercity to Westerland.

Regional services
The following services currently call at Friedberg:
 / Main-Sieg-Express Siegen – Dillenburg – Gießen – Friedberg – Frankfurt (every 2 hours)
 / Mittelhessen-Express Dillenburg – Gießen – Friedberg – Frankfurt (every hour)

Notes

References
 

 

Railway stations in Hesse
Rhine-Main S-Bahn stations
Buildings and structures in Wetteraukreis
Railway stations in Germany opened in 1850
Railway stations in Germany opened in 1913